Sweet Water High School is a public high school that educates grades K–12 in the town of Sweet Water, Alabama, United States.  It is one of three K–12 schools operated by the Marengo County School District.  Sweet Water High School is accredited by the Southern Association of Colleges and Schools.  Enrollment for the 2021-2022 school year was 558.

Academics

Curriculum
In addition to elementary and middle school education, Sweet Water High School is a secondary school along the classic American model. The school curriculum includes traditional high school academic subjects, advanced academic classes, music and art. All students take a basic academic core including English, social studies, science, and mathematics courses.

History
The first school in Sweet Water was established in a log building in the 1850s.  The first incarnation of the modern school dates to the 1870s, when a two-story frame building, topped with a cupola, was built near the current school site on the northeastern side of the junction of Main Street and Wayne Road.  It was founded by Edward Quinney on property donated by Ivey McClure.

The school moved to its present location in 1924, following the completion of a new campus.  The late 1920s saw some consolidation of Marengo County schools, with children from former schools in Beaver Creek, Exmoor, and Aimwell moved to Sweet Water.  The schools at Dixons Mills and Nanafalia were consolidated into Sweet Water in 1950 and 1961, respectively.  New buildings were added to the campus in 1960, 1982, 1989, 1997, and 2001.

Extracurricular
Sweet Water High School offers the following academic clubs, athletic teams, and service organizations.

Clubs and organizations

Bulldog Update
Family, Career, and Community Leaders of America
Partners Assistant Learner
Student Government Association
Students Against Destructive Decisions
Swahelian
Voices of Praise
Junior High Beta Club
Senior High Beta Club
SWHS Bulldog Marching Band

Athletics

Junior Varsity Basketball
Junior Varsity Cheerleading
Junior Varsity Football
Middle School Basketball
Varsity Baseball (State Champions: 1979 [1A], 1980 [1A], 1982 [1A], 1983 [1A], 1986 [1A], 1988 [1A], 1989 [2A], 1990 [2A], 2017 [1A])
Varsity Basketball
Varsity Cheerleading
Varsity Football (State Champions: 1978 [1A], 1979 [1A], 1982 [1A], 1986 [1A], 2004 [1A], 2006 [1A], 2007 [1A], 2008 [1A], 2010 [1A])
Varsity Softball
Varsity Volleyball

Notable alumni
 David Beverly, former NFL punter
 Ced Landrum, Former MLB player (Chicago Cubs, New York Mets)

References

Schools in Marengo County, Alabama
Educational institutions established in the 1870s
Public K-12 schools in Alabama